Aavishkar Madhav Salvi (born 20 October 1981) is an Indian cricketer. He is a right-arm medium-pace bowler and right-handed batsman. In first class cricket, he played for Mumbai. His last match for Mumbai was in 2013. He was also part of the Delhi Daredevils setup in the IPL.

Salvi is currently the fast bowling coach for Oman (on an assignment basis). He started his coaching career as the head coach of Puducherry in 2018 post his retirement. He was reappointed as the head coach for Puducherry cricket team in 2020 owing to the team's good performance under him in his first stint.

With a bowling style similar to Glenn McGrath's, employment of similar line and length and top-notch seam-bowling brought Salvi up from relative obscurity, as backup seamer for his club, to the national team in less than a year, and several Ranji Trophy appearances for his club. He has great strength for a bowler of his height and a commendable run-up.

He has a PhD in astrophysics.

References

External links
 

1981 births
Living people
India One Day International cricketers
Indian cricketers
Mumbai cricketers
Delhi Capitals cricketers
West Zone cricketers